At the end of each Copa América final tournament, several awards are presented to the players and teams which have distinguished themselves in various aspects of the match.

Awards
There are currently five post-tournament awards
 the Best Player for most valuable player, first awarded in 1987;
 the Top Goalscorer for most prolific goal scorer;
 the Best Goalkeeper  for most outstanding goalkeeper,  first awarded in 2011;
 the Team of the Tournament for best combined team of players at the tournament;
 the Fair Play Award for the team with the best record of fair play, first awarded in 2011.

Best Player
The current award was introduced in the 1987 Copa América.

Official

Unofficial 
This list is unofficial

Top Goalscorer

Best Goalkeeper

Team of the Tournament

Official

Unofficial

Fair Play Award

Best Young Player
This award was halted

See also 
 FIFA World Cup awards
 UEFA European Championship awards
 Africa Cup of Nations awards
 AFC Asian Cup awards
 CONCACAF Gold Cup awards
 OFC Nations Cup awards

References

Copa América